The women's 1000 metres race of the 2015–16 ISU Speed Skating World Cup 2, arranged in the Utah Olympic Oval, in Salt Lake City, United States, was held on November 22, 2015.

Brittany Bowe of the United States won the race on a new world record, while Zhang Hong of China came second, and Heather Richardson-Bergsma of the United States came third. Yekaterina Shikhova of Russia won the Division B race.

Results
The race took place on Sunday, November 22, with Division B scheduled in the morning session, at 09:00, and Division A scheduled in the afternoon session, at 13:00.

Division A

Note: WR = world record.

Division B

References

Women 1000
2
ISU